The 2013 Cloverdale Cash Spiel was held from September 20 to 22 at the Cloverdale Curling Club in Surrey, British Columbia as part of the 2013–14 World Curling Tour. Both the men's and women's events were held in a round robin format, and the purses for the men's and women's events were CAD$8,050 each.

Men

Teams
The teams are listed as follows:

Round-robin standings
Final round-robin standings

Playoffs

Women

Teams
The teams are listed as follows:

Round-robin standings
Final round-robin standings

Playoffs

References

External links

2013 in British Columbia
Curling in British Columbia
2013 in Canadian curling